Kolosovka is a rural locality (a selo) and the administrative center of Kolosovsky District of Omsk Oblast, Russia, located on the Osha River. Population:

References

Rural localities in Omsk Oblast